Vinod Kumar Gupta also known as V. K. Gupta (born 10 September 1947) is a retired Indian Judge and first Chief Justice of the Jharkhand High Court.

Career
Gupta completed his early education in Uttar Pradesh and Govt. Gandhi Memorial Science College, Jammu and Kashmir. He passed LL.B. from Delhi University and in 1970 he started practice in Delhi High Court. In his lawyer's career Gupta served as Advocate General of Jammu and Kashmir, Senior Central Government Standing Counsel of Jammu and Kashmir High Court. He associated with the Bar council activities, held the offices of Bar President and Secretary. In 1990, Gupta was elevated as Judge of the Jammu and Kashmir High Court. He was transferred to Calcutta High Court in 1996 and was appointed Acting Chief Justice of Jharkhand High Court in 15 November 2000. He took oath as the first permanent Chief Justice of this High Court on 5 December 2000. Thereafter Justice Gupta joined as the Chief Justice of Himachal Pradesh High Court in 2003. Before the retirement he also held the post of the  Chief Justice of the Uttarakhand High Court since 2 February 2008 to 9 September 2009.

References

1947 births
Living people
Delhi University alumni
Judges of the Calcutta High Court
Chief Justices of the Jharkhand High Court
Chief Justices of the Himachal Pradesh High Court
Chief Justices of the Uttarakhand High Court
20th-century Indian judges
20th-century Indian lawyers
21st-century Indian lawyers
21st-century Indian judges